Ryshiem Henderson is a retired U.S. soccer forward who played at least two seasons in USISL and three games in Major League Soccer with the San Jose Clash.  The official Major League Soccer records have incorrectly spelled Henderson’s first name as Ryseheim.

Early life 
Henderson attended Blackford High School where he was an outstanding prep soccer forward and football defensive back. In 1990, he played in the annual Silicon Valley Youth Classic football game.

College career 
Henderson then played college soccer at Cal Poly San Luis Obispo from 1990-91 to 1994-95. He graduated with a bachelor’s degree in economics. 

As a freshman in 1990, he was selected to the All-CCAA Second Team. Then as a sophomore, he earned first-team all-conference status. Just prior to the final game of his college career, starring for Cal Poly's first squad at the Division I level, Henderson suffered a tear to the anterior cruciate ligament in his left knee. The injury required a replacement of his ACL.

Professional career 
In 1995, Henderson traveled to Europe where he trained with the likes of FC Nurmberg and Bayern Munich of the German Bundesliga before returning to the U.S. In 1996, Henderson signed with the California Jaguars in the USISL, where he led them to their only National Championship as the top goal scorer. This led to his signing by the San Jose Clash. He joined the team prior to their 1996 playoff run.

He played a total of 78 minutes with the Clash before being placed on waivers on October 20, 1996 with nagging knee injuries. In 1998, he played for the expansion San Francisco Bay Seals. He retired from playing professionally in 1998 then entered the financial services sector.

References

External links
 MetLife bio

American money managers
American soccer players
California Jaguars players
San Francisco Seals (soccer) players
San Jose Earthquakes players
USISL Select League players
Living people
Major League Soccer players
USL Second Division players
Cal Poly Mustangs men's soccer players
Association football forwards
Year of birth missing (living people)
Soccer players from San Jose, California